Praze railway station was built to the south of the village of Praze-An-Beeble, Cornwall, England, at an elevation of . The line closed on 5 October 1964 and since closure a house has been built on the site of the station and the girders and bridge deck that took the railway over the road have been removed, leaving just the brick abutments. The only other sign of a station near the village is the road name "Station Hill".

Description
The platform was on the south-west side of the line and was of stone construction with brick edging. Part way along the platform was a station building constructed of small stones with granite quoins, a slate roof and two brick chimneys. At the up end of the station building was a wooden building that housed the ground frame, this being of wooden construction with a slate roof and glazed front giving it the appearance of a tiny signal box. Beyond this at the end of the platform was a circular metal water tank.

Opposite the platform was a single loop which was later truncated at the down end with a buffer stop. This loop (later siding) had coal bins and vehicular access for loading and unloading although there were no goods facilities provided.

References

External links
 Photograph

Disused railway stations in Cornwall
Former Great Western Railway stations
Railway stations in Great Britain opened in 1887
Railway stations in Great Britain closed in 1962